The Great Fire is a four-part television drama first shown on ITV from 16 October to 6 November 2014. It is set during the Great Fire of London in England in 1666. It was written by Tom Bradby and produced by Ecosse Films. Each hour-long (including commercial breaks) episode is set in one day of the fire.

Plot
The series portrays events from the point of view of the Farriner family, in whose bakery on Pudding Lane the fire started, and from the point of view of the royal court in responding to the fire.

The storyline includes events that are not recorded from the real fire. The fire was shown as starting when Farriner's daughter left the oven's stoke-hatch open and the fire ejected a hot ember which ignited loose straw on the wooden floor. It suggests Farriner had a contract to supply baked goods to the Royal Navy and was suffering financial difficulties as a result of the Navy persistently delaying payment. It also follows a sub-plot in which there is a suspected Catholic plot to kill King Charles II, in which the Farriners become suspected of complicity.

Cast
 Andrew Buchan as Thomas Farriner 
 Rose Leslie as Sarah, Thomas Farriner's (fictional) sister-in-law 
 Jack Huston as King Charles II of England
 Daniel Mays as Samuel Pepys 
 Perdita Weeks as Elizabeth Pepys, Samuel's wife
 Oliver Jackson-Cohen as James, Duke of York (the king's brother, the future King James II of England)
 Charles Dance as Lord Denton, the king's (fictional) spymaster 
 Nicholas Blane as Thomas Bloodworth, Lord Mayor of London 
 Andrew Tiernan as Vincent, a prisoner in Newgate Prison 
 Antonia Clarke as Frances Stewart, Duchess of Richmond
 Uriel Emil as Signor Romero
 Sonya Cassidy as Catherine of Braganza

Filming locations
Cobham Hall was used to film some of the London street scenes and Penshurst Place in Kent doubled as the exterior of the King's palace.

Reception
The Guardian was moderately positive, describing it as, 'decent enough drama, if not quite as great as its title would like it to be, and it is lifted by a fine cast, particularly Charles Dance as the sinister intelligence officer Lord Denton.' The Independent also praised the cast, but said the series lacked suspense. The Telegraph gave it two stars.

References

External links
 

2014 British television series debuts
2014 British television series endings
2010s British drama television series
ITV television dramas
2010s British television miniseries
Great Fire of London
Television series by ITV Studios
English-language television shows
Television series set in the 17th century
Television shows set in London
Cultural depictions of Charles II of England
Cultural depictions of Catherine of Braganza